Fight is the eighth studio album of the German female heavy metal singer Doro Pesch. It was released worldwide in 2002 by SPV/Steamhammer.

Fight is the first Doro album since Force Majeure to be produced with a strong contribution from the members of the band that accompanied the German singer on her tours. Nick Douglas, Joe Taylor and Johnny Dee had toured with Doro for more than ten years, while Oliver Palotai replaced Mario Parillo after his death in 2001.

The songs of the album are the usual mix of aggressive metal and soft ballads, with a distinctive rawer sound than in previous albums. At this time Doro tried some versions of the songs in languages different form English or German. What remains of these recordings are the chorus of "Salvaje" in Spanish and the chorus of the single's b-side "Tourjour pour Gasner" in French. The list of musicians sees the contribution of various guests: Type O Negative vocalist Peter Steele, Savatage guitarist Chris Caffery, former Plasmatics bassist Jean Beauvoir, veteran composer Russ Ballard and usual collaborators Chris Lietz, Jürgen Engler and Andreas Bruhn.

The title track was used by German boxer Regina Halmich to introduce her matches, while "Always Live to Win" became the official theme of Rhein Fire NFL Europe football team. "Legends Never Die" is a cover of a song performed by Wendy O. Williams on her album WOW of 1984.

The album was re-released on CD and vinyl on 25 January 2010 by SPV/Steamhammer with some bonus tracks. The extensive booklet includes new photos and liner notes by Doro Pesch and Nick Douglas.

Fight peaked at position No. 18 in the German Longplay chart.

Track listing

Note
Digipak edition has "Fight" and "Always Live to Win" music videos.

Personnel

Band members
 Doro Pesch – vocals, producer
 Nick Douglas – bass, keyboards, backing vocals
 Joe Taylor – guitars, backing vocals
 Johnny Dee – drums, backing vocals
 Oliver Palotai – keyboards, guitars, backing vocals

Additional musicians
 Russ Ballard – guitar on "Wild Heart"
 Jean Beauvoir – guitar on "Sister Darkness"
 Andreas Bruhn – guitars on "Legends Never Die"
 Chris Caffery – guitars on "Salvaje" and guitar solo on "Descent"
 Jürgen Engler – ebow on "Legends Never Die"
 Chris Lietz – guitars, bass, keyboards, producer, engineer, mixing
 Peter Steele – vocals on "Descent"
 Michael Voss – guitar on "Legends Never Die"
 Chris Winter – keyboards on "Wild Heart"

Production
 Kai Blankenberg – mastering
 Dan Malsch – producer, engineer, mixing
 Joe West – engineer

References

External links
American site

Doro (musician) albums
2002 albums
SPV/Steamhammer albums